Marine Heavy Helicopter Squadron 463 (HMH-463) was a United States Marine Corps helicopter squadron consisting of CH-53E Super Stallion transport  helicopters. The squadron, also known as "Pegasus", was last based at Marine Corps Air Station Kaneohe Bay, Hawaii and fell under the command of Marine Aircraft Group 24 (MAG-24) and the 1st Marine Aircraft Wing (1st MAW). HMH-463 was decommissioned in April 2022 as part of the Commandant of the Marine Corps Force Design 2030 initiative.

Mission
Provide assault support transport of combat troops, supplies and equipment during expeditionary, joint or combined operations. Be prepared for short-notice, worldwide employment in support of Marine Air-Ground Task Force operations.

History

Early years
The squadron was originally activated as Marine Bombing Squadron 463 (VMB-463), a fixed-wing bombing squadron, on July 20, 1944 at Marine Corps Air Station Cherry Point, North Carolina and assigned to Marine Aircraft Group 62, 9th Marine Aircraft Wing. In November 1944, the squadron was reassigned to Marine Aircraft Group 34. The following February, the squadron was reassigned to Marine Operational Training Group 81 only to be deactivated on July 28, 1945. On July 15, 1945, the squadron was reactivated at Marine Corps Air Station Santa Barbara, California as Marine Torpedo Bombing Squadron 463 (VMTB-463) and assigned to Marine Aircraft Group 51. The following year, on March 20, 1946, the squadron was once again deactivated and would remain so until 1958. The squadron was reactivated on September 1, 1958 at Marine Corps Air Station Santa Ana, California as Marine Helicopter Transport Squadron 463 and assigned to Marine Air Group 36, 3rd Marine Aircraft Wing and then deactivated again less than a year later on June 30, 1959.

Vietnam War
Marine Heavy Helicopter Squadron 463 was reactivated on March 1, 1966 at MCAS Santa Ana and assigned to Marine Wing Support Group 37, 3rd Marine Aircraft Wing flying the CH-53 Sea Stallion airframe.  A four-plane detachment from HMH-463 deployed to Marble Mountain Air Facility, South Vietnam in December 1966. HMH-463 was reassigned to Marine Aircraft Group 16. The remainder of the squadron would deploy during May 1967 to Marble Mountain where they participated in combat operations during the Vietnam War for the next four years. On 8 January 1968, CH-53A #65-100 crashed in the Hải Lăng Forest south of Đông Hà Combat Base, killing all 46 personnel on board. One of the more different flights taken by the squadron occurred in 1968 when they participated in Operation Bahroom.  This entailed  delivering an elephant via helicopter from the airstrip at Chu Lai Air Base to the Special Forces camp at Tra Bong to work at a local saw mill.  1970 saw the squadron start to delve into bombing missions or what they termed "barrel bombing."  During this time they would fly 2 - 4 ship flights at low altitude to draw enemy fire.  Once they encountered enemy contact they would then fly over the area again and drop 55 gallon drums of gasoline and napalm that were sling-loaded to the bottom of the aircraft.  Usually the force of impact would ignite the barrel mixture but they would occasionally need machine gun fire from the helicopter door guns or rockets from an OV-10 Bronco or AH-1 Cobra.  On a mission over "Charlie Ridge" just west of Danang the squadron dropped over 400 tons of the fuel mixture against entrenched North Vietnamese Army positions.  After the Vietnam War, HMH-463 relocated to Marine Corps Air Station Kaneohe Bay, Hawaii in May 1971 and was reassigned to Marine Aircraft Group 24, 1st Marine Brigade.

In 1973, HMH-463 returned to Vietnam and participated in Operation End Sweep, the minesweeping operations in the Haiphong/Hon Gai Area of North Vietnam from February through July.

On 12 April 1975, the squadron participated in Operation Eagle Pull, the evacuation of Phnom Penh and 17 days later it participated in Operation Frequent Wind, the evacuation of Saigon. For its efforts during the US evacuation of South Vietnam, HMH-463 was awarded the "Outstanding Helicopter Squadron of the Year" award by the Marine Corps Aviation Association in 1975.

1990s

In August 1990, HMH-463 deployed to Saudi Arabia to take part in Operation Desert Shield. The squadron remained in Southwest Asia to participate in Operation Desert Storm before returning to MCAF Kaneohe Bay in March 1991.

2000s
In March 2006, HMH-463 deployed in support of Operation Iraqi Freedom (OIF), making it the first individual CH-53D unit to be deployed to Iraq, but not the first CH-53D to enter the country for OIF/OEF. The squadron returned to MCAF Kaneohe Bay in October 2006.

On August 2009, HMH 463 deployed to the Helmand Province, Afghanistan in support of Operation Enduring Freedom.
By the end of 2011, HMH-463 had retired all of its CH-53D helicopters. The unit completed the transition to the CH-53E in 2012.

On January 14, 2016 twelve Hawaii Marines were killed when two CH-53E Super Stallion helicopters collided off of the North Shore (Oahu).

HMH-463 was decommissioned on April 22, 2022 during a ceremony held at MCAS Kaneohe Bay, HI.  The squadron's stand down was part of a restructure of Marine Corps forces in Hawaii as part of the Commandant of the Marine Corps Force Design 2030 initiative.

Unit awards
A unit citation or commendation is an award bestowed upon an organization for the action cited. Members of the unit who participated in said actions are allowed to wear on their uniforms the awarded unit citation. HMH-463 has been presented with the following awards:

See also

 United States Marine Corps Aviation
 Organization of the United States Marine Corps
 List of active United States Marine Corps aircraft squadrons
 List of inactive United States Marine Corps aircraft squadrons

Notes

References

 Bibliography

Web

 HMH-463's official website
 HMH-463 Vietnam Veterans Website

H463